The Ohinoyi of Ebiraland is the traditional ruler of the Ebira people.  The title Atta of Ebiraland has also historically been used for this position but fell out of favour in the 20th Century. The position is elected by a group of elders and has traditionally rotated amongst the major clans of the Ebira. The current Ohinoyi, His Royal Majesty Alhaji Dr. AbdulRahman Ado Ibrahim, assumed office on 2 June 1997.

List of Rulers of Ebiraland
 Omadivi Abonika (unknown–1917), reigned 1904–1917
 Ibrahim Onoruoiza (1884–1964), reigned 1917–1954 (abdicated)
 Muhamman Sani Omolori, (1919–1990), reigned 1957–1997
 Abdul Rahman Ado Ibrahim (1929–present) reigned 1997–present

References

See also
List of Nigerian traditional states

Royal titles
Nigerian traditional rulers
Titles of national or ethnic leadership